() is a traditional Norwegian main course dinner dish based on lamb ribs.  is a festive dish typical to Western and Northern Norway, and is rapidly gaining popularity in other regions as well. This dish is largely associated with the celebration of Christmas and frequently paired with puréed rutabaga, sausages and potatoes, served with beer and akevitt.

Preparation
The preparation of  uses a traditional method for food preservation utilizing curing, drying and in some regions also smoking as means of inhibiting the growth of micro-organisms. Although lamb is today available fresh or frozen all year round,  is still prepared both commercially and in private homes due to the flavour and maturing the preservation process gives to the meat.

Once sufficiently cured, and when the weather is cold enough, the racks are hung in a cool, dark, well ventilated place to dry. In some regions, particularly in parts of Hordaland and Sunnmøre, the fresh racks are commonly smoked prior to drying. Traditionally this was done in order to prevent mold growth during the drying process.

Before cooking, the racks are separated into individual ribs by cutting a sharp knife between the bones. The ribs must then be soaked in water in order to rinse out the salt and reconstitute the meat. Today  is available in most supermarkets before Christmas, smoked or unsmoked, ready cut and sometimes also soaked, ready for cooking.
After soaking the ribs are steamed over a little water in a large saucepan. Usually, a grid of twigs of birch is placed in the bottom of the saucepan which will allow the meat to steam more than it is cooked.

Etymology
The origin of the word  (literally: 'stick meat') is unclear. It may refer to the birch twigs that many use as a kind of steam grate in the pot. The word  is also used in dialectal Norwegian in reference to single ribs.

In culture
In the Netflix Original series Lady Dynamite (2017, Season 2 episode "Souplutions"), Maria Bamford’s mother makes  for the King and Queen of Norway when they visit Duluth, Minnesota.

See also

 List of dried foods
 List of lamb dishes

References

External links
 Pinnekjøtt – Make Norwegian “Stick Meat
 Matoppskrift.no – How to cook dried mutton ribs
 Mashed Rutabaga  

Norwegian cuisine
Christmas food
Dried meat
Lamb dishes